Mecistophylla is a genus of snout moths. It was described by Alfred Jefferis Turner in 1937.

Species
 Mecistophylla agramma (Lower, 1903)
 Mecistophylla amechanica Turner, 1942
 Mecistophylla asthenitis (Turner, 1904)
 Mecistophylla disema (Lower, 1905)
 Mecistophylla ebenopasta (Turner, 1904)
 Mecistophylla psara Turner, 1937
 Mecistophylla spodoptera (Lower, 1907)
 Mecistophylla stenopepla (Turner, 1904)

References

Tirathabini
Pyralidae genera